The 16th Legislative Assembly of Saskatchewan was elected in the Saskatchewan general election held in October 1967. The assembly sat from February 15, 1968, to May 25, 1971. The Liberal Party led by Ross Thatcher formed the government. The New Democratic Party (NDP) led by Woodrow Lloyd formed the official opposition. Allan Blakeney succeeded Lloyd as party leader in 1970.

James Snedker served as speaker for the assembly.

Members of the Assembly 
The following members were elected to the assembly in 1967:

Notes:

Party Standings 

Notes:

By-elections 
By-elections were held to replace members for various reasons:

Notes:

References 

Terms of the Saskatchewan Legislature